R577 road may refer to:
 R577 road (Ireland)
 R577 (South Africa)